Anthony Edward Martin (born 16 December 1944) is a farmer from Norfolk, England, who shot a burglar dead in his home in August 1999. There was much sympathy for Martin and enthusiastic support for the right to defend one's own home. However, some people cast doubt on his evidence and pointed out that he did not have a valid firearms certificate. Martin was convicted of murder, later reduced to manslaughter on grounds of diminished responsibility and served three years in prison, having been denied parole.

Burglary and shooting 

On 20 August 1999, Tony Martin, a 54-year-old bachelor, was living alone at his farmhouse, Bleak House, in Emneth Hungate, Norfolk. He claimed that he had been burgled a total of ten times, losing £6,000 worth of furniture, though police stated they were unsure if all of the incidents occurred. Martin also complained about police inaction over the burglaries and claimed that multiple items and furniture were stolen, including dinnerware and a grandfather clock. Martin had equipped himself with an illegally held pump-action Winchester Model 1300 12-gauge shotgun which he claimed to have found. Changes in legislation in 1988, resulting from the Hungerford massacre, had changed the licensing treatment of semi-automatic and pump-action shotguns with a magazine capacity of more than two to equate to that of a firearm, requiring a valid firearms certificate. Martin had his shotgun certificate revoked in 1994 after he found a man stealing apples in his orchard and shot a hole in the back of his vehicle.

On the evening of 20 August 1999, two burglars – 29-year-old Brendon Fearon and 16-year-old Fred Barras, both from Newark-on-Trent, Nottinghamshire – broke into Martin's house. Shooting downwards in the dark with his shotgun loaded with birdshot, Martin shot three times towards the intruders (once when they were in the stairwell and twice more when they were trying to flee through the window of an adjacent ground floor room). Barras was hit in the back and both sustained gunshot injuries to their legs. Both escaped through the window but Barras died at the scene. Martin claimed that he opened fire after being woken when the intruders smashed a window.  The prosecution accused him of lying in wait for the burglars and opening fire without warning from close range, in retribution for previous break-ins at his home.

On 10 January 2000, Fearon and 33-year-old Darren Bark (who had acted as the getaway driver), also from Newark-on-Trent, admitted to conspiring to burgle Martin's farmhouse. Fearon was sentenced to three years in prison, and Bark to two-and-half years (with an additional 12 months arising from previous offences). Fearon was released on 10 August 2001. Fred Barras, the dead youth, had already been convicted of a total of 29 offences by the time of his death at the age of 16, including seven convictions for theft and six for fraud. He had been sentenced to two months in a young offenders' institution for assaulting a policeman, theft and being drunk and disorderly. On the night he was killed, Barras had just been released on bail after being accused of stealing garden furniture. His grandmother, Mary Dolan, stated: "It's not fair that the farmer has got all the money and he is the one that took Fred away."

Murder trial 

On 23 August 1999, Martin was charged with the murder of Barras, the attempted murder of Fearon, "wounding with intent to cause injury" to Fearon and "possessing a firearm with intent to endanger life". Martin did not hold a valid shotgun certificate, let alone the more restrictive firearms certificate he would have needed to possess the Winchester pump-action shotgun that held a maximum of five rounds.

English law at the time permitted a person to kill another in self-defence only if the person defending themself uses no more than "reasonable force"; it is the responsibility of the jury to determine whether or not an unreasonable amount of force was used. The jury at the trial were told that they had the option of returning a verdict of manslaughter rather than murder, if they thought that Martin "did not intend to kill or cause serious bodily harm". However, the jurors found Martin guilty of murder by a 10 to 2 majority.

Martin was sentenced to life imprisonment, with a recommended minimum term to serve of nine years, soon afterwards reduced to eight years by the Lord Chief Justice.

Appeal 

An appeal by Martin against his convictions and sentence was first considered in October 2001 by three senior judges headed by Lord Woolf LCJ. Submissions by the defence that Martin had fired in his own defence were rejected by the appeal court. On this occasion, the defence also submitted evidence that Martin was diagnosed with paranoid personality disorder exacerbated by depression and that his paranoia was specifically directed at anyone intruding into his home; he was also diagnosed with Asperger syndrome. This submission was accepted by the Court of Appeal and, on the grounds of diminished responsibility, Martin's murder conviction was replaced by manslaughter carrying a five-year sentence, and his ten-year sentence for wounding Fearon was reduced to three years. These sentences were to run concurrently.

Parole applications and release 

Martin was imprisoned at Highpoint Prison at Stradishall in Suffolk following his conviction. When he became eligible for parole and early release in January 2003, the parole board rejected his application without stating a reason. In an interview with The Times, parole board chairman Sir David Hatch described Martin as "a very dangerous man" who might still believe his action had been right.

Martin challenged the decision in the High Court, where the parole board's decision was upheld. Probation officers on Martin's cases said there was an "unacceptable risk" that Martin might again react with excessive force if other would-be burglars intruded on his Norfolk farm. On 28 July 2003, Martin was released after serving three years of his five-year sentence, the maximum period for which he could be held following good behaviour.

Compensation claim 

During 2003, Fearon applied for, and received, an estimated £5,000 of legal aid to sue Martin for loss of earnings due to the injuries he had sustained. However, the case was thrown into doubt when photographs were published in The Sun, showing him "cycling and climbing with little apparent difficulty" suggesting that Fearon's injuries were not as serious as had been claimed. While the case was pending, Fearon was recalled to jail after being charged with the theft of a vehicle while on probation following a conviction for dealing heroin. Fearon later dropped the case when Martin agreed to drop a counter-claim.

Nick Makin, Martin's solicitor, said: "It is appalling that the family of someone who has a criminal record for burglary and assault should attempt to claim any damages of criminal injury when he was shot while burgling the dwelling of an innocent person... It is also appalling that they may get legal aid while his victim is in prison and patently unable to work and equally cannot get legal aid... There is something wrong and perverse with our legal system that it permits this."

Threats, interviews, and political activity 

The BBC reported in 2003 that Fearon's supporters put a bounty on Martin's head of several tens of thousands of pounds. In July 2003, The Daily Telegraph reported that a cousin of Barras had said that a £60,000 bounty had been put on Martin's head.

In October 2003, the Daily Mirror paid Martin £125,000 for an exclusive interview on his release from prison. After investigation, the Press Complaints Commission ruled that the payment was justified and in the public interest because Martin "had a unique insight into an issue of great public concern".

Following his release, Martin went on to appear on the platform of the UK Independence Party (UKIP) and was the guest-of-honour at the Traditional Britain Group's Annual Dinner at Simpson's-in-the-Strand in London on 7 November 2003. Martin said himself that he had attended meetings of the National Front in Norfolk, and later went on to endorse the British National Party. One of Martin's uncles by marriage, Andrew Fountaine, was a founding member of the National Front.

Books and TV 

 Martin, T. (with John McVicar – editor) (2004), A Right to Kill? : Tony Martin's Story, Artnik, .
 Saunders, J. (2001), Tony Martin and the Bleak House Tragedy, True Crime Library/Forum Press, .
 Turney, B. (2005), Wanted, Waterside Press, .
 The Interrogation of Tony Martin TV movie based partly on transcripts of  police interviews of Marin. Directed by Dave Nath. Martin played by Steve Pemberton. Shown on UK November 2018

See also 

 Castle doctrine
 Death of John Ward
 Defence of property
 Joe Horn shooting controversy
 Katko v. Briney
 Munir Hussain case
 Self-defence in English law
 Vincent family

References

External links 

 Robert Vanderbeck (2003) An analysis of media coverage of the Tony Martin affair, with particular attention to representations of Roma and Irish Travellers.

1944 births
20th-century English criminals
Criminals from Norfolk
Defensive gun use
English farmers
English male criminals
English people convicted of manslaughter
English victims of crime
Living people
People educated at Cokethorpe School
People from King's Lynn and West Norfolk (district)
People with Asperger syndrome
People with paranoid personality disorder